Ziraldo Alves Pinto (born October 24, 1932), usually referred to mononymically as Ziraldo, is a Brazilian author, painter, comic creator, and journalist. His books have sold about ten million copies, have been translated to many foreign languages and adapted to the theater and cinema. His children's books, such as the popular O Menino Maluquinho, have also been the basis of successful films and television series in Brazil.

Biography
Ziraldo first published his work when he was six years old, a year before he started going to school. This was a drawing printed in the newspaper A Folha de Minas in 1938. He began working at the newspaper Folha de S.Paulo in 1954, with a column dedicated to humor. Ziraldo gained national notoriety when he worked at the magazine O Cruzeiro in 1957 and subsequently at Jornal do Brasil in 1963. His characters (including Jeremias o Bom, the Supermãe and Mirinho) won readers.

In 1960, he launched the first Brazilian comic book made by a single author, Turma do Pererê, featuring the Saci of Brazilian folklore, which was also the first comic book produced entirely in color in Brazil. This comic book promoted and also satirized Brazilian traditional values. Although it reached one of the largest runs of the season, Turma do Pererê was canceled in 1964, shortly after the start of the military regime in Brazil. In the 1970s, Editora Abril relaunched the magazine, this time, however, without the same success. Together with other progressive artists, Ziraldo also created the non-conformist comic newspaper O Pasquim during a period of military dictatorship in Brazil. This tabloid, which was based in Carioca, became popular for its humorous critique of the military government.

Ziraldo is the father of the film director Daniela Thomas and the Golden Globe Award-nominated film score composer Antônio Pinto.

External links
 Ziraldo at Google Cultural Institute
Brazilian government site

Lambiek

References

Brazilian comics artists
Living people
1932 births
Brazilian children's writers
Prêmio Angelo Agostini winners
Brazilian caricaturists
Brazilian cartoonists